The reserve league is to be set up in 2016 for clubs who did not want to use the dual registration system.

History
In 2014 and 2015 Super League clubs were unhappy with the Dual registration system and wanted to form an Under 23 reserve leagues between the Under 19s and 1st team. Wigan, Warrington and St Helens were the first teams to propose the return of the reserve league where players could move from the under 19s and play with professional players before playing in the 1st team. In 2015 Hull F.C. were the first team to announce that they would bring back a reserve team and form a reserve league.

In April 2016, just three months into the season, Featherstone Rovers announced they would remove their reserve team due lack of regular fixtures.

Clubs

See also

References

External links

Super League